Pete Rose: Hits & Mrs. is an American reality television series on TLC that chronicles the lives of baseball player Pete Rose, his fiancée Kiana Kim, and Kim's two children — Cassie and Ashton. On July 18, 2012, TLC announced the series started production for a six-episode first season. Amy Winter, general manager of TLC, said "This series will open the door into a very modern family dynamic of trying to blend families when your kids are no longer children, and when your private life is in the public spotlight". The series debuted on January 13, 2013. After airing four episodes, it was stated that the last two episodes would be shelved until the 2013 baseball season started. Despite that statement, the final episodes aired on TLC's sister channel Destination America during a Sunday morning marathon and the network has no plans to air any reruns of the series, thus announcing its cancellation.

Episodes

References

External links
 

2010s American reality television series
2013 American television series debuts
2013 American television series endings
English-language television shows
TLC (TV network) original programming